Christopher Columbus was an explorer born in Genoa, Italy.

Christopher Columbus or Chris Columbus may also refer to:

People
 Chris Columbus (musician) (1902–2002), American jazz drummer
 Chris Columbus (filmmaker) (born 1958), American director

Artwork and monuments
 Christopher Columbus (Vittori), a 1920 public artwork in Indianapolis, Indiana by Enrico Vittori
 Statue of Christopher Columbus (Central Park), an 1892 statue in Central Park, Manhattan, New York by Jeronimo Suñol
 Statue of Christopher Columbus (Chicago), a 1933 statue in Chicago by Carlo Brioschi

Film and TV
 Christopher Columbus (1904 film), a French silent film directed by Vincent Lorant-Heilbronn
 Christopher Columbus (1923 film), a German silent film directed by Márton Garas
 Christopher Columbus (1949 film), a British film directed by David MacDonald
 Christopher Columbus (miniseries), a 1985 television mini-series
 Christopher Columbus: The Discovery, a 1992 film by John Glen

Music
 "Christopher Columbus" (jazz song), a 1936 song co-written by Chu Berry and Andy Razaf and popularized by Fats Waller
 Christopher Columbus, a 1976 opera by Don White for Opera Rara
 "Christopher Columbus" (A1 song) (2013)

Other uses
 SS Christopher Columbus, an American excursion liner
 Christopher Columbus High School (Miami-Dade County), Florida
 Christopher Columbus High School (Bronx), New York
 Christopher Columbus, vol. III and IV of The Long Journey, a Danish novel series by Johannes V. Jensen

People with the given names
 Christopher Columbus Andrews (1829–1922), American soldier, diplomat and author
 Christopher Columbus Kraft, Jr. (1924–2019), NASA's original Flight Director
 Christopher Columbus Langdell (1826–1906), Dean of Harvard Law School

See also
 Chris Columbus, Jr., a 1934 short animated film
 CMA CGM Christophe Colomb, containership
 Columbus (disambiguation)
 Cristoforo Colombo (disambiguation)

Columbus, Christopher